The Hong Kong Institute of Certified Public Accountants (HKICPA) is the professional accounting body of Hong Kong.

Its main responsibilities are:
Registering accountants and issuing practising certificates.
Regulating the professional conduct and standards of members.
Setting codes of ethics and standards of accounting and auditing.
Regulating the quality of entry to the profession through its qualification programme and related courses.
Providing continuing education and other services to members.
Promoting the accountancy profession both in Hong Kong and overseas.

Recognition with other institutions

Association of Chartered Certified Accountants (ACCA)
Prior to 2002, Hong Kong accountants were allowed to obtain full memberships from both Association of Chartered Certified Accountants (ACCA) and HKICPA under a joint examination scheme between the two institutions.  A mutual recognition agreement was then announced between the two institutions; this has been renewed from 2010 until 2015.

Institutes of Chartered Accountants

HKICPA has Mutual Recognition Agreements with the major Chartered Accountant bodies worldwide:

 American Institute of Certified Public Accountants since October 2011
 Institute of Chartered Accountants in England and Wales
 Institute of Chartered Accountants of Scotland
 Institute of Chartered Accountants in Ireland
 Institute of Chartered Accountants of Australia
 Chartered Professional Accountants Canada
 New Zealand Institute of Chartered Accountants
 South African Institute of Chartered Accountants
 Institute of Chartered Accountants of Zimbabwe

These agreements, in general, only apply to relatively recent HKICPA members who qualified through the Qualification Programme.

Other overseas bodies or British qualified accountants
HKICPA also has recognition arrangements in place with:

 Association of International Accountants
 Chartered Institute of Management Accountants
 CPA Australia

Status
Incorporated by the Professional Accountants Ordinance (Chapter 50 of the Laws of Hong Kong) on 1 January 1973, the Hong Kong Institute of Certified Public Accountants (the Institute) is the only statutory licensing body of accountants in Hong Kong responsible for regulation of the accountancy profession.
There is an associate organisation called the HKAAT.

International links
The Institute is a member body of the following international or regional organisations:

 Asia Oceania Tax Consultants' Association
 Confederation of Asian and Pacific Accountants
 Global Accounting Alliance
 International Accounting Standards Board
 International Federation of Accountants
 International Federation of Insolvency Practitioners

See also
Hong Kong Accounting Standards

References

External links
Official Website

Accounting in Hong Kong
Professional associations based in Hong Kong
Organizations established in 1973
Member bodies of the International Federation of Accountants
Statutory bodies in Hong Kong